Audra Ann McDonald (born July 3, 1970) is an American actress and singer. Primarily known for her work on the Broadway stage, she has won six Tony Awards, more performance wins than any other actor, and is the only person to win in all four acting categories. She has performed in musicals, operas, and dramas such as A Moon for the Misbegotten, 110 in the Shade, Carousel, Ragtime, Master Class, and Porgy and Bess. In addition to her six Tony Awards she's received numerous accolades including two Grammy Awards, and  an Emmy Award. She was honored with the National Medal of Arts in 2016 from President Barack Obama and was inducted into the American Theater Hall of Fame in 2017.

As a classical soprano, she has performed in staged operas with the Houston Grand Opera and the Los Angeles Opera and in concerts with symphony orchestras like the Berlin Philharmonic and New York Philharmonic. Her recording of Kurt Weill's Rise and Fall of the City of Mahagonny (2008) with the Los Angeles Opera won the Grammy Award for Best Classical Album and the Grammy Award for Best Opera Recording. She has a close working relationship with composer Michael John LaChiusa who has written several works for her, including the Broadway musical Marie Christine, the opera Send (who are you? i love you), and The Seven Deadly Sins: A Song Cycle. With her full lyric soprano voice, she maintains an active concert and recording career throughout the United States performing a wide repertoire from classical to musical theater to jazz and popular songs. 

On television, McDonald portrayed Dr. Naomi Bennett in the ABC series Private Practice from 2007 to 2011. She also played Liz Lawrence in The Good Wife, and its the spinoff series The Good Fight for which she received three Critics Choice Award nominations. She has twice been nominated for the Primetime Emmy Award for Outstanding Supporting Actress in a Limited Series or Movie, for her portrayals of Susie Monahan in Wit (2001) and Ruth Younger in A Raisin in the Sun (2008). In 2016, she was nominated for the Primetime Emmy Award for Outstanding Lead Actress in a Limited Series or Movie and a Screen Actors Guild Award for her role as Billie Holiday in the HBO film Lady Day at Emerson's Bar and Grill (2016). She won the Primetime Emmy Award for Outstanding Special Class Program in 2015 for her work hosting the program Live from Lincoln Center.

On film, McDonald is best known for her portrayals of Maureen in Ricki and the Flash (2015), Madame de Garderobe in Disney's Beauty and the Beast (2017), and Barbara Siggers Franklin in Respect (2021). She has been nominated seven times for the NAACP Image Awards for her work in television and film.

Early life and education
McDonald was born in West Berlin, Germany, the daughter of American parents, Anna Kathryn (Jones), a university administrator, and Stanley James McDonald Jr., a high school principal. At the time of her birth, her father was stationed with the United States Army. McDonald was raised in her father's native Fresno, California, the elder of two daughters; her sister, Alison, writes and directs for television and film. McDonald graduated from the Roosevelt School of the Arts program within Theodore Roosevelt High School in Fresno. 

She got her start in acting with Dan Pessano and Roger Rocka's Good Company Players, beginning in their junior company. In a feature article about her written when she was a child, she said that she knew she wanted to be involved in theater "when I had my first chance to perform with the Good Company Players Junior Company." She also said that the people who have had the most impact on her life are "Good Company director Dan Pessano and my mother." She studied classical voice as an undergraduate under Ellen Faull at the Juilliard School, graduating in 1993.

Career

Theatre

McDonald was a three-time Tony Award winner by age 28 for her performances in Carousel, Master Class, and Ragtime, placing her alongside Shirley Booth, Gwen Verdon and Zero Mostel by accomplishing this feat within five years. She was nominated for another Tony Award for her performance in Marie Christine before she won her fourth in 2004 for her role in A Raisin in the Sun, placing her in the company of then four-time winning actress Angela Lansbury. She reprised her Raisin role for a 2008 television adaptation, earning her a second Emmy Award nomination. On June 10, 2012, McDonald scored her fifth Tony Award win for her portrayal of Bess in Broadway's The Gershwins' Porgy and Bess, thus tying Angela Lansbury and Julie Harris. Her 2014 performance as Billie Holiday in Lady Day at Emerson's Bar and Grill earned McDonald her sixth Tony award and made her the first person to win all four acting categories.

McDonald appeared as Lizzie in the Roundabout Theatre Company's 2007 revival of 110 in the Shade, directed by Lonny Price at Studio 54, for which she shared the Drama Desk Award for Best Actress in a Musical with Donna Murphy. On April 29, 2007, while she was in previews for the show, her father was killed when an experimental aircraft he was flying crashed north of Sacramento, California.

McDonald is known for defying racial typecasting in her various Tony Award-winning and -nominated roles. Her performances as Carrie Pipperidge in Nicholas Hytner's 1994 revival of Carousel and Lizzie Curry in Lonny Price's 2007 revival of 110 in the Shade made her the first black woman to portray those traditionally white roles in a major Broadway production. Of her groundbreaking work in encouraging diversity in musical theatre casting, she said in an interview for The New York Times, "I refuse to be stereotyped. If I think I am right for a role I will go for it in whatever way I can. I refuse to say no to myself. I can't control what a producer will do or say but I can at least put myself out there." In a Talk of the Nation interview on NPR, Asian-American actor Thom Sesma said McDonald's performance in Carousel "transcended any kind of type at all", proving her to be "more actress than African-American."

McDonald has also performed in opera. In 2006 she made her opera debut at the Houston Grand Opera performing Francis Poulenc's La Voix humaine and the world premiere of Michael John LaChiusa's one-woman opera Send (who are you? I love you). She had previously performed in the world premiere of John Adams' I Was Looking at the Ceiling and Then I Saw the Sky which was given in concert, and can be heard on the 1997 recording of the opera. In 2007 she performed the role of Jenny Smith in Kurt Weill's Rise and Fall of the City of Mahagonny at the Los Angeles Opera. Her performance was recorded and won the Grammy Award for Best Opera Recording in 2009. She appeared in a revised version of George Gershwin's opera Porgy and Bess, at the American Repertory Theatre (in Cambridge, Massachusetts) from August through September 2011, and recreated the role on Broadway at the Richard Rodgers Theatre, which opened on January 12, 2012, and closed on September 23, 2012. For this role, McDonald won her fifth Tony Award and her first in a Leading Actress category. This American Repertory Theater production was "re-imagined by Suzan-Lori Parks and Diedre Murray as a musical for contemporary audiences."

In 2014, she was featured in Lynn Nottage's short play Poof!, alongside Tonya Pinkins. It was produced for radio and podcast by Playing On Air.

She appeared at the Williamstown Theatre Festival, Williamstown, Massachusetts, in Eugene O'Neill's play A Moon for the Misbegotten in August 2015, co-starring with her husband Will Swenson.

In 2016, McDonald starred on Broadway as the vaudeville performer Lottie Gee in a new musical titled Shuffle Along, or, the Making of the Musical Sensation of 1921 and All That Followed about the making of the 1921 musical Shuffle Along. Shuffle Along closed on July 24, 2016, and McDonald began a maternity hiatus at that time. In 2019 McDonald played as Frankie in Frankie and Johnny in the Clair de Lune at the Broadhurst Theatre, earning her ninth Tony Award nomination for her performance for Best Actress in a Play.

Lady Day at Emerson's Bar and Grill 
McDonald played Billie Holiday on Broadway in the play Lady Day at Emerson's Bar and Grill in a limited engagement that ended on August 10, 2014. After previews that began on March 25, 2014, the play opened at the Circle in the Square Theatre on April 13, 2014. Of the play, McDonald said in an interview:

It's about a woman trying to get through a concert performance, which I know something about, and she's doing it at a time when her liver was pickled and she was still doing heroin regularly...I might have been a little judgmental about Billie Holiday early on in my life, but what I've come to admire most about her – and what is fascinating in this show – is that there is never any self-pity. She's almost laughing at how horrible her life has been. I don't think she sees herself as a victim. And she feels an incredible connection to her music – she can't sing a song if she doesn't have some emotional connection to it, which I really understand.

McDonald won the Tony Award for Best Actress in a Play for this role, making her the first person to earn six Tony Award wins for acting (not counting honorary awards) and the first person to win a Tony Award in all four acting categories. In her acceptance speech, "she thanked her parents for encouraging her to pursue her interests as a child." She also thanked the "strong and brave and courageous" African-American women who came before her, saying in part, "I am standing on Lena Horne's shoulders. I am standing on Maya Angelou's shoulders. I am standing on Diahann Carroll and Ruby Dee, and most of all, Billie Holiday. You deserved so much more than you were given when you were on this planet. This is for you, Billie." This performance was filmed at Cafe Brasil in New Orleans and broadcast on HBO on March 12, 2016. McDonald received a 2016 Emmy Award nomination for Outstanding Lead Actress in a Limited Series or Movie for her role in the broadcast.

McDonald had planned to make her West End debut as Holiday in Lady Day in June through September 2016, but after becoming pregnant she postponed these plans. She performed in Lady Day in June 2017 through September 9, 2017, at the Wyndham's Theatre in the West End.

Recordings and concerts

McDonald has maintained ties to her classical training and repertoire. She frequently performs in concert throughout the U.S. and has performed with musical organizations such as the New York Philharmonic and the Mormon Tabernacle Choir. Carnegie Hall commissioned the song cycle The Seven Deadly Sins: A Song Cycle for McDonald, and she performed it at Carnegie's Zankel Hall on June 2, 2004. She sang two solo one-act operas at the Houston Grand Opera in March 2006: Francis Poulenc's La voix humaine and the world premiere of Michael John LaChiusa's Send (who are you? I love you). On February 10, 2007, McDonald starred with Patti LuPone in the Los Angeles Opera production of Kurt Weill's opera Rise and Fall of the City of Mahagonny directed by John Doyle. The recording of this production of Mahagonny won two Grammy Awards, for Best Opera Recording and Best Classical Album in February 2009.

In September 2008, American composer Michael John LaChiusa was quoted in Opera News Online, as working on an adaptation of Bizet's Carmen with McDonald in mind.

McDonald has recorded five solo albums for Nonesuch Records. Her first, the 1998 Way Back to Paradise, featured songs written by a new generation of musical theatre composers who had achieved varying degrees of prominence in the 1990s, particularly LaChiusa, Adam Guettel and Jason Robert Brown.

Her next album, How Glory Goes (2000), combined both old and new works, and included composers Harold Arlen, Leonard Bernstein and Jerome Kern. Her third album, Happy Songs (2002), was big band music from the 1920s through the 1940s. Her fourth album, Build a Bridge (2006), features songs from jazz and pop.

In May 2013, Audra McDonald released her first solo album in seven years, Go Back Home, with a title track from the Kander & Ebb musical The Scottsboro Boys. To coincide with the album's release, McDonald performed a concert at Avery Fisher Hall in New York City that aired on the PBS series Live from Lincoln Center titled Audra McDonald In Concert: Go Back Home.

At the 2010 BCS National Championship Game on January 7, McDonald sang America the Beautiful for the sold-out stadium fans to celebrate the final game of the college football season.

In May 2000, Audra McDonald appeared as "The Beggar Woman" in Lonny Price's concert version of Stephen Sondheim's Sweeney Todd: The Demon Barber of Fleet Street, performed at Avery Fisher Hall at Lincoln Center, New York, with the New York Philharmonic with George Hearn and Patti LuPone. She reprised the role in some performances of the March 2014 Lincoln Center concert production, again directed by Price, this time opposite Bryn Terfel and Emma Thompson. She performed three concerts, titled "Audra McDonald Sings Broadway", in the Sydney Opera House in November 2015, which also included "The Facebook Song" by Kate Miller-Heidke.

Television and film

McDonald has also made many television and film appearances, both musical and dramatic. In 1996 she made her film acting debut in Seven Servants by Daryush Shokof. After being cast in The Object of My Affection and Cradle Will Rock, in 1999 she appeared on the television series Homicide: Life on the Street, in television remake of Annie as Daddy Warbucks' secretary & soon-to-be wife, Miss Farrell, and in the television film Having Our Say: The Delany Sisters' First 100 Years. In 2000, McDonald acted in two episodes of Law & Order: Special Victims Unit and in the television film The Last Debate. 

In 2001, she received her first Emmy Award nomination for Outstanding Supporting Actress in a Miniseries or Movie for the HBO film Wit, which starred Emma Thompson and was directed by Mike Nichols.

In 2003, McDonald starred as Sarah Langley in It Runs in the Family, and as Jackie Brock in nine episodes of short-lived Mister Sterling. From 2005 to 2006, she acted in several television series and films, such as The Bedford Diaries and Kidnapped, while from 2007 to 2013 she played Dr. Naomi Bennett in Private Practice, a spinoff of Grey's Anatomy, replacing Merrin Dungey, who played the role in the series pilot. She sang with the New York Philharmonic in the annual New Year's Eve gala concert on December 31, 2006, featuring music from the movies; it was televised on Live from Lincoln Center by PBS.

In 2008, McDonald starred as Ruth Younger in the critically acclaimed television movie A Raisin in the Sun, and was nominated at the 60th Primetime Emmy Awards for Outstanding Supporting Actress in a Miniseries or Movie, and at the NAACP Image Award for Outstanding Actress in a Television Movie. 

Since 2012, McDonald has served as host for the PBS series Live from Lincoln Center, for which she won a Primetime Emmy Award for Outstanding Special Class Program with the show's producers for Sweeney Todd, aired in 2015. 

In 2013, McDonald appeared in the HBO documentary Six by Sondheim, and she played Mother Abbess in the 2013 NBC live television production of The Sound of Music Live!.

In 2016, McDonald starred as Billie Holiday in the filmed stage production, Lady Day at Emerson's Bar and Grill, for which she received critical acclaim. She earned nominations for the Primetime Emmy Award for Outstanding Lead Actress in a Limited or Anthology Series or Movie and the Screen Actors Guild Award for Outstanding Performance by a Female Actor in a Television Movie or Limited Series. 

In 2017, McDonald starred in Walt Disney Pictures motion picture Beauty and the Beast as Madame de Garderobe, earning a nomination at the NAACP Image Award for Outstanding Supporting Actress in a Motion Picture. 

On August 1, 2017, it was announced that she had been added to the main cast for the second season of The Good Fight, reprising her role as Liz Lawrence from The Good Wife season 4. McDonald stayed in the cast for the next seasons, and was nominated twice for the Critics' Choice Television Award for Best Supporting Actress in a Drama Series.

In 2021, McDonald portrayed Rachel Boutella in television series The Bite and hosted the television ceremony of the 74th Tony Awards. 

In 2021, she appeared as Barbara Siggers Franklin in Aretha Franklin's biographical musical drama film Respect, earning a nomination at the NAACP Image Award for Outstanding Supporting Actress in a Motion Picture. 

In 2022, she starred as Dorothy Scott in HBO's television series The Gilded Age.

Personal life
McDonald married bassist Peter Donovan in September 2000. They have one daughter, Zoe Madeline Donovan, named after McDonald's close friend and Master Class co-star Zoe Caldwell and the late Madeline Kahn. McDonald became close friends with Kahn after they filmed a TV pilot together, and she found out she was carrying a girl the same day she sang at Kahn's memorial. McDonald and Donovan divorced in 2009.

She married Will Swenson on October 6, 2012. On October 19, 2016, she gave birth to their daughter, Sally James McDonald-Swenson. She is the stepmother to Swenson's two sons from his previous marriage.

McDonald attended Joan Rivers' funeral in New York on September 7, 2014, where she sang "Smile".

McDonald resides with her family in Croton-on-Hudson, New York.

Activism and charitable work 
In October 2020, McDonald joined many other Broadway stars in a virtual voter education and letter-writing party sponsored by VoteRiders to raise awareness about voter ID requirements.

In June 2020, McDonald and a coalition of professionals from across the theatre industry launched Black Theatre United, an organization whose mission is to inspire reform and combat systemic racism within the theatre community and throughout the nation. Emphasizing four goalsawareness, accountability, advocacy, and actionBTU works at the community and national levels to elevate anti-racist causes and support the Black community through various resources and initiatives.

McDonald joined other Broadway stars including Lin-Manuel Miranda, Josh Groban, Idina Menzel, Laura Benanti, and Kristin Chenoweth in 2018 to record Singing You Home, a bilingual children's album designed to benefit organizations that aid families separated at the border.

She joined the Covenant House board of Directors in 2014. Covenant House oversees programs for homeless youth in 27 cities in six countries across the United States, Canada, and Latin America. Audra was the recipient of their 2018 Beacon of Hope Award.

Discography

Solo recordings
 Way Back to Paradise (Nonesuch, 1998)
 How Glory Goes (2000)
 Happy Songs (2002)
 Build a Bridge (2006)
 Go Back Home (2013)
 Sing Happy (2018)
Source:

Featured recordings
 Dawn Upshaw Sings Rodgers & Hart – duet on "Why Can't I?" (1996)
 Leonard Bernstein's New York – duet with Mandy Patinkin on "A Little Bit in Love" and "Tonight" (1996)
 George and Ira Gershwin: Standards and Gems – sings "How Long Has This Been Going On?" (1998)
 George Gershwin: The 100th Birthday Celebration – sings Porgy and Bess selections (1998)
 Myths and Hymns – sings "Pegasus" (1999)
 My Favorite Broadway: The Leading Ladies – sings "The Webber Love Trio" (1999)
 Broadway In Love – sings "You Were Meant For Me" from The Object of My Affection (2000)
 Broadway Cares: Home for the Holidays – sings "White Christmas" (2001)
 Bright Eyed Joy: The Songs Of Ricky Ian Gordon – sings "Daybreak in Alabama" (2001)
 Zeitgeist – sings "Think Twice" (2005)
 The Wonder of Christmas with the Mormon Tabernacle Choir (2004)
 Barbara Cook at the Met – sings "When Did I Fall In Love?" and "Blue Skies" (2006)
 Jule Styne in Hollywood – sings "10,432 Sheep" (2006)
 Sondheim: The Birthday Concert – sings "Too Many Mornings" and "The Glamorous Life" (2010)
 Stages – duet on "If I Loved You", 2014
Source:

Cast recordings
 Carousel (1994 Broadway Revival Cast Recording) (1994)
 Ragtime (Original Cast Recording) (1998)
 I Was Looking at the Ceiling and Then I Saw the Sky by John Adams (Studio Cast Recording) (1998)
 Wonderful Town (Berlin Cast Recording) (1999)
 Marie Christine (Original Cast Recording) (1999)
 Sweeney Todd Live at the New York Philharmonic (2000)
 Dreamgirls in Concert (2001 Concert Cast Recording) (released February 2002)
 Wonderful Town (Studio Recording) (2005)
 110 in the Shade (2007 Broadway Revival Cast Recording) (2007)
 Rise and Fall of the City of Mahagonny (Concert Cast Recording) (2007)
 Rodgers and Hammerstein's Allegro (First Complete Recording) (2009)
 The Gershwins' Porgy and Bess (New Broadway Cast Recording) (2012)
 Lady Day at Emerson's Bar and Grill (Original Broadway Cast Recording) (2014)

Video recordings
 Audra McDonald – Live at the Donmar London, VHS (1999)
 My Favorite Broadway: The Leading Ladies ("The Webber Love Trio"), DVD & CD (1999)
 Bernstein – Wonderful Town with Kim Criswell, Thomas Hampson, Wayne Marshall, Simon Rattle, and Berlin Philharmonic, DVD (2005)
 The Wonder of Christmas with the Mormon Tabernacle Choir and Orchestra at Temple Square, DVD (2005)
 Weill – Rise and Fall of the City of Mahagonny, DVD (2007)
 Sondheim! The Birthday Concert, Blu-ray DVD (2010)

Audio books
 Alice Walker, By The Light of My Father's Smile (1998)
 Connie Briscoe, A Long Way From Home (1999)
 Rita Dove, Second-Hand Man (2003)
 Jodi Picoult, Small Great Things (2016)

Filmography

Film

Television

Theatre

Concerts
Audra McDonald in Concert (2013–14)

23 concerts total; the gap between May and October 2013 is due to McDonald's work with television and her album coming out, causing the three and a half month gap. The tour ended due to McDonald's show, Lady Day at Emerson's Bar and Grill opening on Broadway, but she picked up again with a new tour once the show closed.

An Evening with Audra McDonald (2014–15)

37 concerts; this tour marked her Australian debut. The lack of August shows was due to her run in A Moon for the Misbegotten.

Other concerts

 1999 – Audra McDonald: Live at the Donmar London (filmed for a DVD)
 February, 2002, Live with the Utah Symphony Abravenal Hall Salt Lake City, UT (part of the 2002 Olympics Arts Festival)
 June 2, 2004 – The Seven Deadly Sins: A Song Cycle at Carnegie Hall
 August 26, 2007 – Ravinia Festival
 March 28, 2008 – Savannah Music Festival
 March 30, 2008 – Ferst Center for the Arts
 April 26, 2008 – Stanley Theater
 May 30, 2008 – Zellerbach Hall
 February 1, 2010 – Ralph Freud Playhouse
 April 26, 2010 – Louise M. Davies Symphony Hall
 July 18, 2010 – Ozawa Hall in Boston
 October 22, 2011 – Carnegie Hall
 November 8, 2011 – Curtis M Phillips Center for Performing Arts
 April 20, 2012 – New Jersey Performing Arts Center
 January 2, 2016 – Parker Playhouse
 January 17, 2016 – Leicester Square Theatre
 November 17, 2018 – Hill Auditorium, Ann Arbor, MI
 October 7–8, 2019 – Noorda Center for Performing Art at Utah Valley University, Orem, UT

Honors and achievements

In 2012, Audra McDonald received the Golden Plate Award of the American Academy of Achievement presented by Awards Council member General Colin Powell.

On September 22, 2016, Audra McDonald was awarded the National Medal of Arts by President Barack Obama for 2015. The Award states, in part: "for lighting up Broadway as one of its brightest stars.... In musicals, concerts, operas, and the recording studio, her rich, soulful voice continues to take her audiences to new heights."

In 2017 she was inducted into the American Theater Hall of Fame.

Explanatory notes

References

External links

 Audra McDonald at IMG Artists
 Audra McDonald Biography and Interview on American Academy of Achievement
 
 
 
 
 Audra McDonald at Nonesuch Records
 Audra McDonald – Downstage Center interview at American Theatre Wing.org
 Audra McDonald's February 5, 2007 interview on the Tavis Smiley Show (TV Interview)
 Audra McDonald: Shaping 'Bess' On Broadway, interview on Fresh Air (29 mins, 2012)

1970 births
Living people
20th-century American actresses
21st-century American actresses
Actresses from Fresno, California
African-American actresses
American film actresses
American musical theatre actresses
American operatic sopranos
American Shakespearean actresses
American stage actresses
American television actresses
American voice actresses
Audiobook narrators
Drama Desk Award winners
Grammy Award winners
Juilliard School alumni
Musicians from Fresno, California
Nonesuch Records artists
People from Croton-on-Hudson, New York
People from Fresno, California
Primetime Emmy Award winners
Tony Award winners
United States National Medal of Arts recipients
20th-century African-American women singers
Singers from California
Classical musicians from California
21st-century African-American women singers
African-American history of Westchester County, New York